Acanthocobitis pavonacea, also known as the spearfin loach, is a species of ray-finned fish. It is known to be found in northeastern India in the Ganges and Brahmaputra basins. This species may be the only member of its genus if a 2015 recommendation to divide the genus Acanthocobitis is followed, currently Fishbase does not do so.

References

Nemacheilidae
Fish described in 1839
Taxobox binomials not recognized by IUCN